Dhieu Mathok Diing Wol is a South Sudanese politician and the Minister of Investment in the Revitalized Transitional Government of National Unity (R-TGoNU), Republic of South Sudan, as of 2022.

He also served as Secretary of South Sudan Mediation Committee on Sudanese Peace Talks in Juba.

He was a Minister, in the Ministry of Energy and Dams in 2016

In November 2021, Dhieu tested positive for COVID-19 in Doha, Qatar, a claim he rejected later as a false positive result.

References 

Living people

Year of birth missing (living people)
Government ministers of South Sudan